31 Minutes to Takeoff is the debut studio album by American singer Mike Posner. It was released on 10 August 2010, by J Records. The album includes the singles "Cooler Than Me", "Please Don't Go" and "Bow Chicka Wow Wow".

Background
Posner's idea for the album was to make something that didn't sound like anything that was already out. In an interview with Billboard, Posner argues: "My music doesn't sound like anyone else's, and it's important for me that it stays that way", and that "I want to make songs that will bring people together", Posner has stated that he draws a great deal of influence for his music from his hometown "Where I grew up was a huge influence on my music." He also said that "A lot of people have trouble putting into words what my music is, and it's because of where I grew up". Meanwhile, speaking to Blues & Soul about the album's stylistic diversity, he described it as "A 21st Century album – meaning that, instead of listening to 12 different artists on your iPod, with my record you can just listen to ONE! Because every song is refreshing and different from the one before, and at the same time BETTER than the one before!"

The title of the album, 31 Minutes to Takeoff, is in fact a reference to something that occurs exactly 31 minutes into the record. As Posner himself describes it "Something happens 31 minutes into the record ... All I can say is that both the listener and I will be in a higher place when it's over". 31 minutes into the CD, during "Synthesizer", there is a sound of an airplane taking off.

Music and lyrics
Musically, 31 Minutes to Takeoff consists of a blend of pop, R&B, and dance songs with heavy use of synthesizers straight out of the 1980s, influences of hip hop music while also incorporating electronic music with clever hooks and catchy beats. Songs like "Please Don't Go", "Cooler Than Me", and "Cheated", are up-tempo dance songs. "Please Don't Go" is an electropop song with an R&B infused beat and heavy-use "video game" like synths in its chorus. "Cheated" follows a similar path, with a more dance oriented beat and repetitive hook, and "Cooler Than Me", is electropop based with nu-disco influences. "Bow Chicka Wow Wow", "Déjà Vu", and "Do You Wanna?" are mid-tempo songs carrying R&B sounds, with "Delta 1406" following the same path with a faded beat. "Bow Chicka Wow Wow" carries its R&B sound with a rock music feel, while "Déjà Vu", a song written with Teddy Riley, blends 1990s R&B sound with contemporary pop and features Boyz II Men on background vocals. "Do You Wanna?" is a hip hop old-school R&B song, with stax horns, whistles, over a bluesy guitar that samples Ray LaMontagne "You Are The Best Thing". "Gone In September" is a pop acoustic-rock tune, while "Save Your Goodbye," and "Synthesizer" are synthpop ballads.

Lyrically, the album references Posner's personal experiences, ranging from love and rise to fame at age 22. Its first single "Cooler Than Me" is about a girl who thinks she's cooler than anybody and "needs everyone's eyes just to feel seen." In an interview with US Weekly, Posner says the "song was inspired by a girl [I] went to Duke with, but she doesn't deserve any notoriety". "Bow Chicka Wow Wow" is a song 'to reel a woman in.' "Cheated" sees Posner singing about his regret at not cheating on a former flame who cheated on him with lyrics like "I should have cheated on you/ I was everything you wanted and more/ I should have cheated on you / nobody told me I was dating a whore", while later calls out his ex by name. "Gone In September" is a song about Posner breaking up with a woman. "Delta 1406" is a song about Posner's current rise to fame, written on his flight back home to Detroit, after spending 5 months in Los Angeles, (“I’ve got to book hotels for my Detroit shows”) says Posner as a reflection of what he was dealing with at the time. "Please Don't Go" shows Posner begging a girl to stay.

Promotion
Posner was part of Warped Tour which takes a North American leg. 42 Tour dates were announced via Mike's official MySpace account, and will take place through the summer of 2010. On May 31, 2010, Posner appeared on Lopez Tonight with a performance of "Cooler Than Me". Fifteen days later, he appeared on America's Got Talent with a performance of "Cooler Than Me".

Singles
"Cooler Than Me" was released as the album's lead single. The song reached the top ten in the US, peaking at number six, and the top five peaking at number three in New Zealand and number five in Canada. The song's video was released on YouTube and features Posner in a party with girls wearing sunglasses. Snowboarder Louie Vito makes a cameo appearance in the video.  It sold over 2,000,000 downloads in the US. "Please Don't Go" was released on iTunes on July 19, 2010, and was confirmed as the album's second single. It debuted at number ninety-four on the Billboard Hot 100 and has peaked at number sixteen. It sold over 1,000,000 downloads in the US.

"Bow Chicka Wow Wow" was released as the third single on February 3, 2011 and features American rapper Lil Wayne. The song was released on the radio on February 22, 2011. It debuted at number eighty-two on the Billboard Hot 100 and has reached number thirty. It sold over 500,000 downloads in the US.

Critical response 

The album has received mixed reviews from critics, with some complimenting the electro-pop sound, while others felt it was neither new nor fresh. According to Metacritic, which assigns a normalized rating out of 100 to reviews from mainstream critics, the album holds a score of 58 out of 100, indicating "mixed or average reviews", based on 8 reviews. Leah Greenblatt of Entertainment Weekly gave the album a B, praising Posner's breezy anthems. David Jeffries of Allmusic also wrote favorably of the album, stating, "Posner’s entertaining debut is right in line with his reported Duke grade point average of B+".

Commercial performance 
The album debuted at number eight on the US Billboard 200, with first-week sales of 29,000 copies. The album has sold 177,000 copies in the US as of April 2016.

Track listing

Charts

Certifications

References

2010 debut albums
Albums produced by Benny Blanco
Albums produced by Greg Kurstin
Albums produced by Mike Posner
Albums produced by the Smeezingtons
J Records albums
Mike Posner albums